Said Amin (Gabe) Ghabrial (October 1, 1939 – November 26, 2018) was an Egyptian-American plant pathologist, known for his work on mycoviruses – viruses of fungi – and particularly their effects on the virulence of plant-pathogenic fungi. He also researched bean pod mottle virus, an economically important soybean disease. He was professor of plant pathology at the University of Kentucky (1986–2014).

Early life and education
Ghabrial was born in Cairo, where he attended public schools and then the College of Agriculture at Cairo University, gaining a BS in agriculture (1959). He worked at the Egyptian Ministry of Land Reform (1959–61) and then briefly did national service in the Egyptian Army. In 1961, he went to the United States on a government scholarship, and studied in the Plant Pathology Department of Louisiana State University, where he gained an MS (1963) and PhD (1965) in plant pathology, supervised by Thomas Pirone. His MS research was on tomato leaf mold, a fungal disease of tomatoes caused by Cladosporium fulvum (Passalora fulva). His PhD research was on wilting of Tabasco pepper (Capsicum frutescens) caused by tobacco etch virus.

Career and research
Ghabrial carried out post-doctoral research at the University of California, Davis, on Southern bean mosaic virus under Robert Shepherd and Raymond Grogan (1965–66). After returning to Egypt, where he worked for the Ministry of Agriculture on economically important plant viruses (1966–70), he moved to the United States and took up a post-doctoral position in the Botany and Plant Pathology Department of Purdue University (1970–72) under Richard M. Lister; he worked on the segmented plant viruses tobacco rattle virus and tobacco streak virus. 

In 1972, Ghabrial moved to the University of Kentucky, where he remained until his retirement, holding successively assistant (1972–75), associate (1975–86) and full professorships (1986–2014) in the Plant Pathology Department. He also held visiting professorships at the University of California, Davis (1978–79), Oregon State University (1988–89) and the University of California, Berkeley (2000–01). 

One major focus of his research at Kentucky was on mycoviruses that infect fungal pathogens of plants. He discovered and characterized a virus in the Totiviridae family that infects the fungal pathogen Helminthosporium victoriae, which causes the economically important disease Victoria blight in oats. Most fungal viruses do not affect their host but Ghabrial showed that the virus attenuates the virulence of the fungus. This raises the possibility that such viruses might in future be used in the biological control of plant diseases caused by fungi. Another long-term research focus was viral diseases of soybean (Glycine max), particularly the economically important bean pod mottle virus.

He was elected a fellow of the American Phytopathological Society in 2002. He twice chaired the International Committee on Taxonomy of Viruses's fungal virus subcommittee (1987–93 and 2011–14) and was one of the editors of the sixth edition (1995) of its Virus Taxonomy report. He authored or co-authored around 150 articles in peer-reviewed journals as well as many book chapters.

Personal life
Ghabrial married Karlin Upton Ghabrial, whom he met in Davis, in 1966. They had a son and two daughters. He died on November 26, 2018.

Selected publications
Books
Said A. Ghabrial (ed.) Mycoviruses (Advances in Virus Research 86) (Academic Press; 2013)
Frederick A. Murphy, Claude M. Fauquet, David H. L. Bishop, Said A. Ghabrial, Audrey W. Jarvis, Giovanni P. Martelli, Mike A. Mayo, Max D. Summers (eds) Virus Taxonomy (Springer-Verlag; 1995)
Reviews

Research articles

References

External links
Profile at the University of Kentucky
Publications list

1939 births
2018 deaths
Scientists from Cairo
Cairo University alumni
Louisiana State University alumni
University of Kentucky faculty
Egyptian biologists
American phytopathologists
American virologists